Timothy Carroll Hurst (June 30, 1865 – June 4, 1915) was an American sports official who worked as an umpire and manager in Major League Baseball and as a boxing referee in championship fights. 

After his season of managing the Browns, he returned to his umpiring career.

From 1891 through 1904 he umpired in the National League, then finished his career in the American League from 1905-1909. 

Noted for his pugnacious and combative style, Hurst was suspended on several occasions for refusing to report player misconduct to his league office, insisting instead he ought to be allowed to settle matters with players personally, often engaging them in fights after the game was over. 

In 1946 Hurst was among several umpires named to the Honor Rolls of Baseball by the Baseball Hall of Fame, at a time when no umpires had yet received full membership in the Hall. 

Hurst was born in Ashland, Pennsylvania and died at the age of 49 in Pottsville, Pennsylvania. 

He is interred at the Calvary Cemetery in Woodside, Queens, New York.

References

External links
Baseball-Reference manager page

1865 births
1915 deaths
Major League Baseball umpires
19th-century baseball umpires
American boxing referees
St. Louis Browns managers
Sportspeople from Pennsylvania
People from Ashland, Pennsylvania